Batocarpus is a genus of trees in the family Moraceae, native to North and South America (from Costa Rica to Bolivia).

Taxonomy 
The genus Batocarpus contains the following species:
 Batocarpus amazonicus (Ducke) Fosberg
 Batocarpus costaricensis Standl. & L.O. Williams
 Batocarpus orinocensis H. Karst.

References

Moraceae
Moraceae genera